Jonathan Luke Wood (born February 21, 1982), known professionally as J. Luke Wood, is an American social scientist, author, and the Dean's Distinguished Professor of Education at San Diego State University(SDSU). According to "The Black in the Crimson and Black," Wood is the first Black distinguished professor in SDSU history. He is consistent voice on leadership theory, black male achievement and school suspensions. Wood is a professor at San Diego State University and co-director of the Community College Equity Assessment Lab (CCEAL), a national research and practice center that partners with community colleges on issues regarding men of color.

In 2013, Wood received the Barbara K. Townsend Emerging Scholar Award from the Council for the Study of Community Colleges of the American Association of Community Colleges. In 2022, Wood was recognized as a Leader Driving Change by the College Futures Foundation for his work on race and racism.

Career 
Along with Frank Harris III, Wood is credited with coining the term "Racelighting" to refer to what occurs when gaslighting is racial. They define racelighting as "an act of psychological manipulation where people of color receive racial messages that distort their realities and lead them to second-guess themselves." Unlike gaslighting, they assert that racelighting can be conscious and unconscious. They state that active racelighting occurs when the perpetrator intentionally sows doubt and disorients their victim. Passive racelighting occurs when the perpetrator unintentionally communicates racial messages a racial microaggressions that similarly sow doubt and disorient their victims. Wood and Harris argued that when companies and universities released statements of solidarity that are inauthentic and have no plan for action, that these statements serve to racelight their Black, Indigenous and People of Color (BIPOC) constituencies.

Wood has been a vocal critic of the concept of Growth Mindset, a psychological theory asserting that students learn best when they perceive intelligence as an outgrowth of hard work, resilience, and effort. In contrast, a fixed mindset sees intelligence as a fixed trait (i.e., smart vs. not smart). Wood has argued against a growth mindset practice of validating students' effort and not their inherent abilities. He has asserted that this perspective is not effective for Black children who are less likely to hear messages that validate their intelligence and abilities (e.g., "you are intelligent", "you are capable". Instead, Wood argues that Black children are more likely to receive messages from educators that downplay their intelligence. As a result, he calls for a balanced approach of validating both students' effort and their abilities.  Wood stated “You can validate the effort that they put in, their perseverance, but you also have to give them that life-giving message that they are capable."

Wood served as the lead co-sponsor (through the Black Minds Matter Coalition) of California Assembly Bill 740. This bill was authored by Assembly member Kevin McCarty and signed by Governor Gavin Newsom on September 22, 2022. The bill requires schools to notify a child’s state-appointed attorney, who advocates on their behalf, of any school discipline proceedings. This bill was based on recommendations from research conducted by Wood and his colleagues.

Black Minds Matter 
In 2017, Wood taught a nationally broadcast course titled “Black Minds Matter: A Focus on Black Boys and Men in Education.” The course was streamed to a registered audience of 10,000 learners who participated as individuals and at 260 live broadcast and replay sites across the nation. Each session included commentary from Wood and featured guest speakers such as Shaun R. Harper, Ilyasah Shabazz, Patrisse Cullors, Jerlando F. L. Jackson, S. Lee Merritt, and Frank Harris III. A review of each week of the course was released in HuffPost. According to the public syllabus, the course was “Black Minds Matter is a public course designed to increase the national consciousness about issues facing Black boys and men in education. The course draws parallels between issues faced by Black males in society and the ways that Black minds are engaged in the classroom." The course was panned by conservatives as a propaganda for the Black Lives Matter movement. Wood indicated that the course was offered as a response to the shooting of Alfred Olango by police officers in El Cajon California, near San Diego.

The third offering of Black Minds Matter took place on July 16, 2020, to an audience of 30,000 learners. The course drew "parallels between the policing of Black lives and the schooling of Black minds."

Publications 
Wood has authored over 170 publications, including 16 books, and more than 78 peer-reviewed journal articles. His 2018 book Black Minds Matter was identified as one of "Five Books that Every White Ally Should Read on Black Lives" by Diverse Issues in Higher Education and as a resource for allies by NBC. His books include:
 Black Minds Matter: Realizing the Brilliance, Dignity, and Morality of Black Males in Education
 Teaching boys and young men of color: A guidebook
 Teaching men of color in the community college: A guidebook
 Advancing Black male student success from preschool through PhD
 Black men in higher education: A guide to ensuring success
 Ethical leadership and the community colleges: Paradigms, decision-making, and praxis
 Black male collegians: Increasing access, retention, and persistence in higher education
 STEM models of success: Programs, policies, and practices in the community college
 Leadership theory and the community college: Applying theory to practice
 Community colleges and STEM: Examining underrepresented racial and ethnic minorities
 Black men in college: Implications for HBCU's and beyond
 Black males in post-secondary education: Examining their experiences in diverse institutional contexts
 Community college leadership and administration: Theory, practice and change

Personal life 
J. Luke Wood is a former ward of the court and foster child. He and his twin brother Joshua were adopted by a White family and raised in a foster home. Wood is married and has three children. He is a member of Alpha Phi Alpha fraternity, and an amateur boxer in the masters cruiserweight division.

References

American educational theorists
1982 births
Living people
American social scientists
San Diego State University faculty